OCT Harbour, formerly known as OCT Bay and Happy Harbour, is a large retail and entertainment complex in Shenzhen, China. It covers an area of roughly 1.25 km2. and features amongst others, a manmade lake and canals, hotels and a shopping mall. It was opened to the public in 2011.

References

Buildings and structures in Shenzhen
Tourist attractions in Shenzhen
Shopping malls in Shenzhen